The Sabaeans or Sabeans (Sabaean:, ;) were an ancient group of South Arabians. They spoke the Sabaean language, one of the Old South Arabian languages. They founded the kingdom of Sabaʾ in modern-day Yemen, which was believed to be the biblical land of Sheba and "the oldest and most important of the South Arabian kingdoms".

The exact date of the foundation of Sabaʾ is a point of disagreement among scholars. Kenneth Kitchen dates the kingdom to between 1200 BCE and 275 CE, with its capital at Maʾrib, in what is now Yemen. On the other hand, Israel Finkelstein and Neil Asher Silberman believe that "the Sabaean kingdom began to flourish only from the eighth century BC onward" and that the story of Solomon and the Queen of Sheba is "an anachronistic seventh-century set piece." The Kingdom fell after a long but sporadic civil war between several Yemenite dynasties claiming kingship; from this, the late Himyarite Kingdom arose as victors.

Sabaeans are mentioned several times in the Hebrew Bible.

History 

The origin of the Sabaean Kingdom is uncertain. Kenneth Kitchen dates the kingdom to around 1200 BCE, while Israel Finkelstein and Neil Asher Silberman write that "the Sabaean kingdom began to flourish only from the eighth century BCE onward". Originally, the Sabaeans were one of the shaʿbs, "communities", on the edge of the Sayhad desert. Very early, at the beginning of the 1st millennium BC, the political leaders of this tribal community managed to create a huge commonwealth of shaʿbs occupying most of South Arabian territory and took the title , "Mukarrib of the Sabaeans".

Several factors caused a significant decline of the Sabaean state and civilization by the end of the 1st millennium BC. Saba' was conquered by the Himyarites in the first century BCE; but after the disintegration of the first Himyarite Kingdom of the Kings of Saba' and Dhū Raydān, the Middle Sabaean Kingdom reappeared in the early second century. The Middle Sabaean Kingdom was different from the Ancient Sabaean Kingdom in many important respects. The Sabaean kingdom was finally conquered by the Ḥimyarites in the late 3rd century, and at that time, the capital was Ma'rib. It was located along the strip of desert called Sayhad by medieval Arab geographers, which is now named Ramlat al-Sab'atayn.

The Sabaean people used an ancient Semitic tongue of their own, Sabaean or Himyaritic, which is what Ethiopian is based on. Each of these peoples had regional kingdoms in ancient Yemen, with the Minaeans in Wādī al-Jawf to the north, the Sabeans on the southwestern tip, stretching from the highlands to the sea; the Qatabānians to the east of them, and the Ḥaḑramites east of them. The Sabaeans, like the other Yemenite kingdoms of the same period, were involved in the extremely lucrative spice trade, especially frankincense and myrrh. They left behind many inscriptions in the monumental ancient South Arabian script or Musnad, as well as numerous documents in the related cursive Zabūr script.

Religious practices 

Muslim writer Muhammad Shukri al-Alusi compares their religious practices to Islam in his Bulugh al-'Arab fi Ahwal al-'Arab:

According to heresiographies Shahrastain, Sabaeans accept both the sensible and intelligible world, but do not follow religious laws, but center their worship on spiritual entities.

Mentions in religious texts

Baha'i Writings 
Sabaeans are mentioned many times in the Baha’i Writings as regional people and of their religious practice. The religion is considered among the true religion of God as an early part of a historical process of progressive revelation where God guides humanity by sending Divine Educators throughout time to teach people of the religion of God. They have also been mentioned in the book Secrets of Divine Civilization by `Abdu’l-Bahá’ as those peoples who have possibly contributed to the foundations of the science of logic.

Bible 
Sabaeans are mentioned in the biblical books of Genesis, 1 Kings (which includes the account of Solomon and the Queen of Sheba), Isaiah, Joel, Ezekiel and Job. The latter mentions Sabaeans as having slain Job's livestock and servants. In Isaiah they are described as "tall of stature".

Qur'an 

The name of Saba' is mentioned in the Qur'an twice, in the 27th and 34th sūrahs, with the latter being named after the area. The former refers to the area in the context of Solomon and the Queen of Sheba, whereas the latter refers to the Sayl al-ʿArim (Flood of the Dam), in which the historic dam was ruined by flooding. As for the phrase Qawm Tubbaʿ ("People of Tubbaʿ"), which occurs in the 44th and 50th Chapters, Tubbaʿ was a title for kings of Saba', like for Himyarites.

See also 
 Ancient South Arabian art
 Azd
 Hamdan tribe
 Minaean Kingdom

References

Further reading 
 Bafaqīh, M. ‛A., L'unification du Yémen antique. La lutte entre Saba’, Himyar et le Hadramawt de Ier au IIIème siècle de l'ère chrétienne. Paris, 1990 (Bibliothèque de Raydan, 1).
 
 Andrey Korotayev. Ancient Yemen. Oxford: Oxford University Press, 1995.  .
 
 Ryckmans, J., Müller, W. W., and ‛Abdallah, Yu., Textes du Yémen Antique inscrits sur bois. Louvain-la-Neuve, 1994 (Publications de l'Institut Orientaliste de Louvain, 43).
 Info Please
 Article at Encyclopædia Britannica

External links 
 S. Arabian "Inscription of Abraha" in the Sabaean language, at Smithsonian/NMNH website

Ancient Arabic peoples
 
States and territories established in the 12th century BC
States and territories disestablished in the 3rd century
Yemeni tribes
Tribes of Arabia
Semitic-speaking peoples
Sheba
Former kingdoms
Former theocracies